The 1982–83 season was Liverpool Football Club's 91st season in existence and their 21st consecutive season in the First Division. After winning the title previous season, Liverpool F.C. regained and won their fourteenth league title. They also won the Football League Cup for the third successive season beating Manchester United 2-1 at Wembley Stadium.

However, Liverpool did not regain the European Cup, having been knocked out by Widzew Łódź in the quarter-finals and surprisingly being knocked out by Brighton & Hove Albion in the fifth round of the FA Cup. Liverpool lost 5 of their last 7 league games and drew the other two, yet they finished the season eleven points ahead of the second-placed Watford. 

After nine years, Bob Paisley had decided to retire after winning six league championships, three European Cups, three League Cups, four FA Charity Shields, one European Super Cup and one UEFA Cup.

Squad

Goalkeepers
  Bob Wardle
  Bruce Grobbelaar

Defenders
  Phil Neal
  Alan Hansen
  John McGregor
  Phil Thompson
  Alan Kennedy
  Mark Lawrenson

Midfielders
  Craig Johnston
  Sammy Lee
  Terry McDermott
  Graeme Souness
  Ronnie Whelan
  Steve Nicol

Attackers
  Kenny Dalglish
  David Fairclough
  Howard Gayle
  David Hodgson
  Ian Rush

League table

Results

First Division

FA Charity Shield

FA Cup

League Cup

Final

European Cup

References
LFC History.net – Games for the 1982–83 season
Liverweb - Games for the 1982–83 season

Liverpool F.C. seasons
Liverpool
English football championship-winning seasons